Denis Ljubović (born 20 March 1988) is a Croatian football defender who currently plays for Norwegian amateur side Øystese Fotball.

Club career
He spent the first few years of his professional career with Rijeka in Croatia’s Prva HNL and was with the club until 2011. The following two seasons he played with Karlovac and Zadar in Prva HNL, before moving to Domžale in Slovenia’s Prva Liga. He had a short spell with Opatija in Croatian Third Division.

References

External links
 

1988 births
Living people
Footballers from Rijeka
Association football defenders
Croatian footballers
HNK Orijent players
HNK Rijeka players
NK Karlovac players
NK Zadar players
NK Domžale players
NK Opatija players
Croatian Football League players
Slovenian PrvaLiga players
Norwegian Third Division players
Croatian expatriate footballers
Expatriate footballers in Slovenia
Croatian expatriate sportspeople in Slovenia
Expatriate footballers in Norway
Croatian expatriate sportspeople in Norway